Rise of Nations is a series of real-time strategy video game. It includes:

Rise of Nations, the first video game in the series
Rise of Nations: Thrones and Patriots, the expansion pack to the original game
Rise of Nations: Extended Edition, the re-release of the original game and the expansion
Rise of Nations: Rise of Legends, a real-time strategy fantasy spin-off of the series